Shearjashub may refer to:

Shearjashub, a minor Old Testament figure
Shearjashub Bourn (1721–1781), Justice of the Rhode Island Supreme Court
Shearjashub Bourne (1746–1806), U.S. congressman from Massachusetts
Shearjashub Spooner (1809–1859), American physician and writer